Sphingobacterium suaedae is a Gram-negative, non-spore-forming and non-motile bacterium from the genus of Sphingobacterium which has been isolated from rhizosphere soil from the plant Suaeda corniculata from the bank of the Wuliangsuhai Lake in the Inner Mongolia in China.

References

Sphingobacteriia
Bacteria described in 2015